Mon Repos is a village on the island nation of Saint Lucia. It is located on the Atlantic Ocean coast of Saint Lucia, near Praslin, Micoud District. It contains many communities including Lumbard, Mamiku, La Pointe (including Paris Drive, Phiadel, Morne Bois-Den), Patience, Collie Town (Knockay Avenue), St. Marie, Vietnam, Malgretoute, Ryon, Piton.

Local  sites
The village is the commercial center for these areas; housing a credit union, gas station, grocery and variety store, restaurants, a primary school, the St. Ann's Catholic Church and the Seventh Day Adventist Church which also has a primary school. There are three primary schools in the village of Mon Repos. Namely Mon Repos (Roman Catholic) Combined School located in the village itself. The Patience Combined School which can be found en route to the Vietnam community and the SDA primary school, also located in the Mon repos village. It also has provision of two day care centres and Pre Schools. The highly popular Smith's Pre-school which has been the foundation for many generations dating years back and is still thriving.

Sports
The Mon Repos Youth and Sports Council is formed of a committee which is an avid promoter/supporter of positive change and influences among the youth and community members. Among many things, the council host events such as pageants, sports competitions and also lead the organisation of the annual Independence Road Relay (from the Mon Repos community to Wanee bridge and back). Majority of the communities have a sports club and come together to compete in many sports (football, cricket, netball, and even an annual athletics meet).

Politics
Mon Repos is part of the Micoud North electoral area, which is represented in the House of Assembly of Saint Lucia.

See also
List of cities in Saint Lucia
Districts of Saint Lucia

References

Towns in Saint Lucia